Jonas Lie (31 December 1899 – 11 May 1945) was a Norwegian councilor of state in the Nasjonal Samling government of Vidkun Quisling in 1940, then acting councilor of state 1940–1941, and Minister of Police between 1941 and 1945 in the new Quisling government. Lie was the grandson of the novelist Jonas Lie and the son of the writer Erik Lie.

Early life
Raised in a family with close ties to Germany, Lie was a war correspondent on the Western front and Eastern front during World War I. He was a successful police officer in the 1930s. He was the police officer charged with accompanying Leon Trotsky on a freighter from Norway to Mexico. His political convictions may have been influenced by his uncle Nils Kjær, who was an ardent antisemite.

Fascism
It is possible that Lie was introduced to Heinrich Himmler as early as 1935. They maintained a close personal relationship during the entire Nazi era. Lie became a rival of Vidkun Quisling's during the occupation of Norway.

Despite his later collaborationist stance, Lie took part in the defense of Norway after the German invasion of Norway, fighting at Folldal. After suffering an injury to his foot, Lie was captured by the Germans and briefly held prisoner.

Lie became one of the first Norwegian SS volunteers when he served for a brief period of time during the Balkans Campaign of 1940 as a war correspondent in Leibstandarte Adolf Hitler together with Minister of Justice Sverre Riisnæs. He later led the 1st Police Company of the Norwegian Legion of the Waffen-SS on the Leningrad Front in 1942–43.

Lie was also the official leader of the Germanic-SS in Norway. This organisation, first known as Norges SS (founded 1941) and Germanske SS Norge (re-founded 1942) was a Norwegian equivalent to the German Allgemeine-SS.

In late 1944, after pressure from Josef Terboven, Quisling appointed the Ministers Jonas Lie and Johan Andreas Lippestad as 1st and 2nd County Governors of Finnmark county in the extreme north of Norway. Lie, Lippestand and others went to Kirkenes in mid-October 1944 to order an evacuation of the civil population in order to assist the German plans for a scorched earth policy in the face of the Soviet forces who were about to push German forces back into Norway.

He died at Skallum on 11 May 1945, just before being arrested. The cause of death is unknown, as the autopsy was unable to find any evidence of suicide. It was widely believed a combination of stress, a large consumption of alcohol and lack of sleep was the cause of his death. It is also a fact that he had a heart condition, was a chain-smoker and had several other health problems.

Writing
In the tradition of his father and grandfather, Lie was also a writer in his own right. During the 1930s, he produced a number of popular detective novels under the pen name Max Mauser. In 1942, he also published Over Balkans syv blåner, an account of his service with the Leibstandarte Adolf Hitler in the Balkans.

References

External links

 Ny bok om nazisten Jonas Lie, in Aftenposten, retrieved 4 November 2007

1899 births
1945 deaths
20th-century Norwegian novelists
20th-century Norwegian politicians
War correspondents of World War I
Norwegian Army personnel of World War II
Norwegian prisoners of war in World War II
World War II prisoners of war held by Germany
Government ministers of Norway
Norwegian police chiefs
Norwegian crime fiction writers
Members of Nasjonal Samling
SS-Standartenführer
War correspondents of World War II
Norwegian anti-communists
Norwegian Waffen-SS personnel
Ministers of Justice of Norway